FabricLive.50 is a 2010 DJ mix album by dBridge and Instra:mental. The album was released as part of the FabricLive Mix Series.

Track listing
 Riya – Seems Like – Exit Records
 Instra:mental – From the Start – Autonomic
 Stray – Pushed – Exit Records
 Dan Habarnam – Nu Este Roz – Exit Records
 Vaccine – Ochre – NonPlus+
 ASC – Starkwood (Consequence Remix) – Unreleased
 Consequence – Lover's Shell – Unreleased
 Distance – Sky's Alight (Dub) – Autonomic
 Alix Perez – Self Control – Shogun Audio
 2 Tracks Mixed:
 Genotype – Distorted Dreams – Genotype
 Meleka – Go (Accapella) – Meleka
 Instra:mental – End Credits – NonPlus+LTD
 Instra:mental – Watching You – NonPlus+
 Instra:mental – Fist (Level 2B Mix) (A.K.A. Bubble Lab) – Unreleased
 Consequence – 11 Circles (ASC Remix) – Unreleased
 dBridge – I Know – Exit Records
 Instra:mental – Encke Gap – NonPlus+
 2 Tracks Mixed:
 Loxy & Genotype – Farah's Theme – Exit Records
 dBridge – Inner Disbelief (Accapella) – Exit Records
 Pearson Sound – Down with You – Darkestral
 Scuba – Tense (dBridge Remix) – Hotflush Recordings
 Instra:mental – No Future (Consequence Remix) – NonPlus+
 Code 3 – Living Proof – Exit Records
 Consequence ft Instra:mental – Reflex Reaction – Exit Records
 ASC – Phobos – NonPlus+
 Skream – Fire Call – Exit Records
 Instra:mental – Machine Made – NonPlus+
 dBridge – Love Hotel – Exit Records
 dBridge – The Dim Light – Exit Records
 Scuba – Eclipse – Paul Rose
 ASC – Ubiquity Incident – NonPlus+
 Abstract Elements – Abysmal Depth – Exit Records
 Actress – Gen Ohn (Screwed Version) – Werk Discs

References

External links
Fabric: FabricLive.50
dBridge & Instra:mental mix FabricLive 50

Fabric (club) albums
2010 compilation albums